Minckleyella is a monotypic genus of gastropods belonging to the family Cochliopidae. The only species is Minckleyella balnearis.

This freshwater snail genus is named in honor of Wendell L. Minckley.

The species is found in the Chihuahuan Desert of northern Mexico.

References

Gastropods
Monotypic gastropod genera
Endemic molluscs of Mexico
Fauna of the Chihuahuan Desert